Gehyra multiporosa is a species of gecko endemic to Western Australia.

References

Gehyra
Reptiles described in 2012
Geckos of Australia